Drogo ( or) may refer to:

People
Ordered chronologically.
Drogo of Champagne (670–708), Duke of Champagne
Drogo (mayor of the palace) (c. 730–?), Merovingian mayor of the palace of Austrasia
Drogo of Metz (801–855), Bishop of Metz and illegitimate son of Charlemagne
Drogo, Duke of Brittany (died 958), also Count of Vannes
Drogo of Mantes (996–1035), Count of the Véxin
Drogo of Hauteville (c. 1010–1051), Count of Apulia and Calabria
Drogo de la Beuvrière (disappeared c. 1087), an associate of William the Conqueror and first lord of Holderness
Drogo of Nesle, a participant in the First Crusade
Saint Drogo (1105–c. 1185), French hermit

Transport
Piero Drogo, Italian coachbuilder and car driver
Ferrari 250 GT Drogo
Ferdinand Le Drogo, French road bicycle racer
Paul Le Drogo, French road bicycle racer

Fiction
Khal Drogo, the Dothraki lord who weds Daenerys Targaryen in George R. R. Martin's A Song of Ice and Fire series
Drogo Baggins, father of Frodo Baggins in J.R.R Tolkien's The Lord of The Rings

Other uses
 Castle Drogo, a mansion house in Devon, England
 Drogo Sacramentary, a Carolingian illuminated manuscript from c. 850 AD

See also

Drogon (disambiguation)
Dogo (disambiguation)
Drongo
Diogo (disambiguation)
Darga